Winmostar is a molecular modelling and visualisation software program that computes quantum chemistry, molecular dynamics, and solid physics.

Development history
2001 Winmostar V0.40 Windows
2008 Winmostar V3.71 
2012 Winmostar V4.00
2014 Winmostar V5.00
2015 Winmostar V6.00
2016 Winmostar V7.00
2017 Winmostar V8.00
2019 Winmostar V9.00
2020 Winmostar V10.00

References

External links
 Winmostar web page

Molecular dynamics software